Charles Hendrikse (13 April 1962 – 8 August 1992) was a South African cricketer. He played in four first-class matches for Boland from 1980/81 tp 1982/83.

See also
 List of Boland representative cricketers

References

External links
 

1962 births
1992 deaths
South African cricketers
Boland cricketers
People from Stellenbosch
Cricketers from the Western Cape